Liparochrysis is a genus of spiders in the family Liocranidae. It was first described in 1909 by Simon. , it contains only one species, Liparochrysis resplendens, found in western Australia.

References

Liocranidae
Monotypic Araneomorphae genera
Spiders of Australia